Rhododendron rufum (黄毛杜鹃) is a rhododendron species native to southwestern China, where it grows at altitudes of . It is an evergreen shrub or small tree that grows to 1.5–8 m in height, with leathery leaves that are elliptic to oblong-ovate, 6.5–11 by 3–5 cm in size. The flowers are white to pink with crimson spots.

Synonyms
Rhododendron weldianum Rehder & E.H. Wilson

References

"Rhododendron rufum", Batalin, Trudy Imp. S.-Peterburgsk. Bot. Sada. 11: 490. 1891.

rufum